Romulo Barrameda Espeña (November 22, 1952 – May 12, 2013), known as Tita Swarding, was a Filipino radio broadcaster and columnist who worked for the Manila Broadcasting Company-owned DZRH.

Life and career
Tita Swarding was born on November 22, 1952, as Romulo Espeña. Swarding joined Manila Broadcasting Company-owned DZRH before it was shut down after the imposition of Martial Law on September 21, 1972.

After Martial Law, Swarding returned to DZRH and resumed his broadcasting career. Tita Swarding became the showbiz segment anchor of Balitang Bayan Numero Uno during the time of Joe Taruc and Rey Langit (later replaced by Tiya Dely Magpayo in 1992).

Tita Swarding had a Sunday afternoon program entitled DZRH Showbiz Balita, which was aired after the station moved to Pasay. Tita Swarding was also the Columnist of Pinoy Parazzi.

Death
At the age of 60, Tita Swarding suffered Emphysema and was rushed to the Quezon City General Hospital. He died on May 12, 2013.

Filmography

Radio
Balitang Bayan Numero Uno (Showbiz segment)
DZRH Showbiz Balita

References

1952 births
2013 deaths
Filipino radio personalities
Filipino radio journalists
Manila Broadcasting Company people